Tímea Babos and Mandy Minella were the defending champions, but they decided not to participate this year.
Lara Arruabarrena and Caroline Garcia won the title, defeating Vania King and Chanelle Scheepers in the final, 7–6(7–5), 6–4.

Seeds

  Vania King /  Chanelle Scheepers (final)
  Lourdes Domínguez Lino /  Arantxa Parra Santonja (semifinals)
  Irina-Camelia Begu /  María Irigoyen (quarterfinals)
  Sharon Fichman /  Alexandra Panova (semifinals)

Draw

Draw

References 
 Main draw

Copa Colsanitas - Doubles
2014 Doubles